Torbjörn Klingvall (born 30 May 1955) is a Swedish handball coach for the Swedish women's national team.

References

1955 births
Living people
Swedish handball coaches